EnglishRussia is a popular photoblog focusing on unusual aspects of Russian or former-Soviet culture. Technorati rated it the 155th most popular website out of 94 million on its search engine. It was created by a Russian software technician and is currently more popular in America than in Russia.

The website seems to experience some troubles. The Facebook page was hacked, and between the 13/06/2019 and 14/06/2019, the design of the website change, becoming more "clean", without logo. The privacy policy is now written in Portuguese and the ads are ruled by a Brazilian company. With these changes, many old pages lost their pictures and some articles are not readable anymore. The email address don't answer. (but the link with the Portuguese society goes back earlier, the old version was already linked to the ad company). Also, the official Twitter account and Facebook no longer exist.

It has been mentioned by many media sources, newspapers or websites such as The St. Petersburg Times, Softpedia, and The Daily Telegraph.

Footnotes

External links 
 

Photoblogs
Russian websites